CPU is a computer's central processing unit.

CPU may also refer to:

Science and technology
 Carboxypeptidase B2, a human enzyme
 Critical Patch Update, software updates in Oracle products such as Oracle Database and Java

Organisations
 Caribbean Postal Union, an association of postal (post office) administrators in the Caribbean region
 Central Philippine University
 Central Policy Unit, a head advisory unit to the Chief Executive of Hong Kong
 Central Police University, a police academy in Taiwan
 China Pharmaceutical University
 Clark Public Utilities, a public electric and water utility located in Clark County, Washington
 Columbia Pacific University,  former unaccredited distance learning school in California
 Commonwealth Press Union, an association of newspapers and news agencies
 Communist Party of Ukraine
 Computer Professionals' Union, an organization of information and technology professionals, practitioners, and workers in the Philippines
 Contract postal unit, any contracted affiliate of the United States Postal Service
 Conférence des Présidents d'Université, an organization of university presidents in France

Other uses
 Console Patron Units, the goddesses in Hyperdimension Neptunia